Eusynthemis ursa is a species of dragonfly of the family Synthemistidae,
known as the Barrington tigertail. 
It is a bulky, medium-sized dragonfly with black and yellow markings.
It has been found at altitude in the vicinity of Barrington Tops, New South Wales, Australia

Gallery

See also
 List of Odonata species of Australia

References

Synthemistidae
Odonata of Australia
Insects of Australia
Endemic fauna of Australia
Taxa named by Günther Theischinger
Insects described in 1999